Rossana is a comune (municipality) in the Province of Cuneo in the Italian region Piedmont, located about  southwest of Turin and about  northwest of Cuneo.

Rossana borders the following municipalities: Busca, Costigliole Saluzzo, Piasco and Venasca.

Demographic evolution

References

Cities and towns in Piedmont